Nebo, West Virginia may refer to the following communities in West Virginia:
Nebo, Clay County, West Virginia, an unincorporated community in Clay County
Nebo, Upshur County, West Virginia, an unincorporated community in Upshur County